Mind control, or brainwashing, is the concept that the human mind can be altered or controlled by certain psychological techniques.

Mind control may also refer to:

Related to thoughts
 Brain–computer interface
 Neuroprosthetics, the technology of controlling robotics with neural impulses
 Silva Method, also known as Silva Mind Control
 Electronic harassment

Arts and entertainment

Film and television
 Mind Control (film) or Control, a 1987 Italian film
 Mind Control (TV series), a 2000–2003 British series featuring mentalist Derren Brown
 Mind Control with Derren Brown, a 2007 American TV series

Music
 "Mind Control", the last song on Slayer's sixth album, Divine Intervention
 Mind Control (Canibus album) or the title song, 2005
 Mind Control (Stephen Marley album) or the title song, 2007
 Mind Control (Tantric album), 2009
 "Mind Control" (song), the title song
 Mind Control (Uncle Acid & the Deadbeats album), 2013

See also
Hypnosis
Psychological manipulation